Endwar may refer to:

Media
Tom Clancy's EndWar, a video game based on a futuristic global war, in the Tom Clancy series of games
Tom Clancy's EndWar (novel), the novel written by David Michaels which ties in with the game

People
Endwar (concrete poet), a concrete poet from Athens, Ohio, U.S.

Other
The final confrontation between the forces of Good and Evil in the Book of Revelation with its culmination at the battle of Armageddon
Short for "The war to end war"